DBL Group, formerly known as Dulal Brothers Limited, is a Bangladeshi diversified conglomerate based in Dhaka with a focus on the garments industry. The company has received investments from International Finance Corporation, German Investment Corporation, and Swedfund. It has invested to make its factories more green.

History 
DBL Group was established in 1991 as Dulal Brothers Limited. The company expanded in the 1994 from a single factory under M. A. Jabbar, managing director of DBL Group. The company was named after Dulal, brother of M. A. Jabbar, who was killed in 1971 by the Pakistan Army during Bangladesh Liberation War and is managed by the surviving four brothers and their children. M. A. Rahim Feroz is the vice chairman of DBL Group.

In April 2012, DBL Group signed an agreement with IBCS-PRIMAX Software (Bangladesh) Ltd for automation of certain activities at the company. International Finance Corporation provided funding for DBL Group's dying factory, titled colour city, of US$10.5 million in 2014.

DBL Group invested US$100 million in Ethiopia to establish a combined textile and garment factory in 2016. The group received funding from Swedfund and Development Bank of Ethiopia. DBL announced plans to invest US$1.2 billion to establish 19 factories inside DBL Industrial Park in the Srihatta Economic Zone in Sylhet Division.

In 2019, DBL Group became the official franchise of Puma in Bangladesh and established the first store in Dhaka. It manufactures products of Swedish company H&M. In 2020, it had the second largest market share of methocarbamol generic drug in the United States. It evacuated workers from Ethiopia after the outbreak of the Tigray War.

DBL group announced plans to invest US$650 million to establish 10 factories (textiles, ceramics, toiletries, etc) inside DBL Industrial Park in the Srihatta Economic Zone in Sylhet Division. In October 2021, International Finance Corporation provided US$22.7 million to build a dying and finishing factory called Hamza Textiles Limited. It launched DBL Pharmaceuticals in November.

DBL Group announced plans to invest in Vietnam in April 2022 to establish a sewing thread factory. In October 2022, DBL Group signed an agreement with HSBC for host-to-host integration. Shakib al Hasan is the brand ambassador of DBL Ceramics which makes ceramic tiles. It operates a subsidized grocery store for its employees, one of many textile companies in Bangladesh to do so.

In January 2023, British International Investment signed an agreement with DBL Group to provide US$52 million to finance the construction of Jinnat Textile Mills Limited at DBL Industrial Park in the Srihatta Economic Zone in Sylhet Division. It established the first Puma outlet outside of Dhaka in Chittagong in January.

Subsidiaries 

 Dulal Brothers Limited
 Jinnat Apparels Limited
 Flamingo Fashions Limited
 Jinnat Fashions Limited
 Jinnat Knitwears Limited
 Mawna Fashions Limited
 Matin Spinning Mills Limited
 Mymun Textiles Limited
 Hamza Textiles Limited
 Color City Limited
 DB Tex Limited
 Thanbee Print World Limited
 Parkway Packaging & Printing Limited
 DBL Distribution Limited
 DBL Ceramics Limited
 Textile Testing Services Limited
 DBL Telecom Limited
 DBL Communications Private Limited
 DBTEL
 DBL Sports Limited (owned Chittagong Vikings)
 DBL Dredging Limited
 Color City Limited (Eco Threads & Yarns)
 DBL Pharma

References 

1991 establishments in Bangladesh
Organisations based in Dhaka
Conglomerate companies of Bangladesh